Siri Kristine Nordby (born 4 August 1978) is a Norwegian football defender who played over fifteen years for Røa in Norway's Toppserien league. She also played for the Norway women's national football team.

Career
Nordby started her career at Hosle IL, but quickly moved to neighbors Røa when she had to play for an all-girls team. Nordby has played with Røa almost her entire life, aside from the few years she played in the United States at the University of South Florida, and has tallied 250 appearances for the club. She is Røa's set-piece specialist (free kicks, corners and penalty kicks) as well as the vice-captain, and in 2008 captained Røa to "the Double" of Norway's league and Cup titles.  She has even signed a lifetime contract with Røa to demonstrate her commitment to the team.

She made her debut with the national team on 24 July 2004 in a match against Germany. Nordby scored her first goal for the national team on 3 May 2008 in a Euro qualification match against Israel. Her second goal came on a penalty against Brazil in the quarterfinals at the 2008 Summer Olympics.

Nordby often played left- and right-back on the national team under coach Bjarne Berntsen, who is known to place his players in different positions.

She was a part of the squad for the 2005 European Championships that won silver after being defeated by Germany, 3–1, in the final. She was also a member of the 2007 Women's World Cup squad that finished the tournament fourth as well as the 2008 Olympics team which was beaten by Brazil in the quarterfinals.

On 21 October 2008 Siri Nordby and four other Røa players—Marie Knutsen, Guro Knutsen, Marit Fiane Christensen and Lene Mykjåland—made headlines when they announced in a press release that they would not be returning to the national team due to issues the five had with the national team leadership. While the press statement never mentioned coach Bjarne Berntsen's name, it was assumed that he was instrumental in their decision to retire from the team. Siri Nordby however, denied that this was directed solely at Berntsen. The retirement, which came off in many newspapers as a boycott, created widespread media attention.

She has worked as a physical trainer for Øvrevoll Hosle IL's men's team, for whom her brother Sverre was the head coach. Her other brother, Geir Nordby, was her coach at Røa IL. After the 2012 season she retired from top-flight football, but after a few months she joined Øvrevoll Hosle IL, whose women's team hunted promotion from the Second Division.

Honors
South Florida Bulls

 Conference USA champion: 1998

Røa
 League champion: 2004, 2007, 2008
 Cup champion: 2004, 2006, 2008

References

External links
Official Norwegian Football Association player profile
Aftenposten profile

1978 births
Living people
Sportspeople from Bærum
Norwegian women's footballers
Women's association football defenders
Norway women's international footballers
Footballers at the 2008 Summer Olympics
Olympic footballers of Norway
Røa IL players
South Florida Bulls women's soccer players
2007 FIFA Women's World Cup players
Norwegian expatriate women's footballers
Expatriate women's soccer players in the United States
Norwegian expatriate sportspeople in the United States
University of South Florida olympians